Oakland Township is a township in Clay County, Kansas, United States.  As of the 2000 census, its population was 110.

Geography
According to the USGS, it contains two cemeteries: Pleasant Valley and Rose Meron.

References
 USGS Geographic Names Information System (GNIS)

External links
 City-Data.com

Townships in Clay County, Kansas
Townships in Kansas